Batemans Bay is a town on the South Coast region of the state of New South Wales, Australia. Batemans Bay is administered by the Eurobodalla Shire council. The town is situated on the shores of an estuary formed where the Clyde River meets the southern Pacific Ocean.

At the 2021 census, Batemans Bay had a population of 17,519.

It is the closest seaside town to Canberra, making Batemans Bay a popular holiday destination for residents of Australia's national capital. Geologically, it is situated in the far southern reaches of the Sydney Basin. 

Batemans Bay is also a popular retiree haven, but has begun to attract young families seeking affordable housing and a relaxed seaside lifestyle. Other local industries include oyster farming, forestry, eco-tourism and retail services. The town's two main shopping centres are Village Centre Batemans Bay and the Bridge Plaza.

History

Indigenous history
The traditional custodians of the land surrounding Batemans Bay are the Walbunja people of the Yuin nation.

The language spoken by the Walbunja people is Dhurga, one of the  Yuin–Kuric languages.

A number of sites in the region are considered culturally significant to the Walbunja people, such as Bhundoo and Hanging Rock.

The Walbunja name for the bay is Yangary.

Indigenous population

According to the 2021 census, there were a total of 8,581 people in the Batemans Bay urban centre. Aboriginal and Torres Strait Islander people made up 8.3% of the population, significantly higher than the state average of 3.4% and national average of 3.2%.

European history
On 22 April 1770 explorer James Cook first sighted and named the bay. Cook gave no reason for the name, which may commemorate either Nathaniel Bateman, the captain of HMS Northumberland when Cook was serving as her master from 1760 to 1762, or John Bateman, 2nd Viscount Bateman, a former Lord Commissioner of the Admiralty in the 1750s.

A colonial vessel, Fly, was driven into Batemans Bay by bad weather during April 1808. Her crew engaged in a conflict with the local Indigenous peoples, initially firing their muskets from the vessel; after the muskets were fired, spears were thrown in return, resulting in three Fly crew fatalities. In 1821, Lt Robert Johnston entered the bay and explored the lower reaches of the Clyde River on board the cutter Snapper. Snapper Island within the bay is named after Johnston's boat. Johnston returned with Alexander Berry and Hamilton Hume and they traced the river to its source. When the district was surveyed in 1828, a deserted hut and stockyards were found. Cedar getters and land clearers were in the district in the 1820s. From 1820s through to the 1840s, the area to the Moruya River was the southernmost official limit of location for the colony of New South Wales.

The Illawarra and South Coast Steam Navigation Co found the Clyde River to be navigable in 1854. Regular services by the company in the 1860s and 1870s contributed to growth of the district.

The village of China Bay was surveyed in 1859. Oyster farming commenced in 1860, and by 1870, there was a fleet of 40 oyster boats. A sawmill was erected in 1870. The port and town was proclaimed in 1885. A ferry service across the Clyde ran from 1891 until the bridge was opened in 1956. In 1942, during World War II, a trawler was attacked by a Japanese submarine between Batemans Bay and Moruya.

European population
The change of population of Batemans Bay since 1881.
 1881 was 266
 1961 was 
 1981 was 
 1996 was 
 2006 was 
 2011 was 
 2021 was

2016 flying fox plague
In May 2016, an estimated 120,000 grey-headed flying fox (bats) suddenly descended upon and swarmed the town, prompting the town to declare a state of emergency. The grey-headed flying fox is listed as a vulnerable species threatened by extinction and is protected by conservation laws; due to this status, they had to be removed using non-lethal methods, including smoke, noise, lights and removal of vegetation. The town received AUS$2.5 million to relocate the bats.

2019-20 bushfire emergency
In December 2019, the town was under the threat of a catastrophic bushfire, which ultimately cut Batemans Bay off from all external road links, isolating the town.

The bushfire gradually increased in intensity and severity, peaking on New Year's Eve and rapidly moving towards the town. The bushfire resulted in thousands of locals sheltering at beaches around the town, a large number of buildings lost, and lingering economic damage.

Due to the difficult mountainous terrain surrounding Batemans Bay, much of the firefighting efforts could only be fought from the air, with a number of firefighting aircraft tasked to defend the town. With the difficulties of the highway closures cutting the town off from outside links on the ground, Moruya Airport proved to be a vital resource in the protection of the local region from the devastating bushfires.

Demographics 

According to the 2021 census of population, there were 8,581 people in the Batemans Bay urban centre.
 Aboriginal and Torres Strait Islander people made up 8.3% of the population. 
 77.8% of people were born in Australia. The next most common countries of birth were England 4.9% and New Zealand 1.3%.   
 88% of people only spoke English at home. 
 The most common responses for religion were No Religion 39.4%, Catholic 20.1% and Anglican 19.4%.

The median age in Batemans Bay is 51 years, compared with the Australian national average of 38 years.  For people aged 60 years and above, Batemans Bay is well above the national average, and has twice as many people aged 70 years or over than the national average. Conversely, in all age demographic groups below 60 years, Batemans Bay is below national averages. This is most strongly presented in the categories for ages 19 to 35 years.

This skewed demographic is attributed to Batemans Bay's proximity to Canberra, from where it attracts a large number of retirees. In recent years, community concern has grown as hotels and resorts in the region have been purchased and converted to aged care and retirement living, creating a perceived threat to the town's primary industry – tourism. In addition, the aged demographic has been said to create a culture were the towns infrastructure is geared towards the aged, resulting in a net migration away from Batemans Bay of younger families exacerbating the imbalance. In 2015, research from Nielsen revealed older people were less likely to support rates funding towards youth focussed infrastructure.

Arts and culture

Foreshore
With its stunning natural features at the forefront, and an aged population, the arts and cultural scene in Batemans Bay was seen for some time as underdeveloped for a regional hub.  As the town has recently enjoyed a renaissance of its CBD, so too its arts and cultural landscape, with a growing and interesting calendar of events and a strong community of practicing artists.

Mackay Park
This shift is best illustrated in the announcement of 26 million dollars toward the development of an indoor aquatic and cultural centre. To be built at the Mackay Park precinct, the cultural facility will include a purpose-built exhibition and performance centre, as well as workshop and storage space that will serve the wider region's 18 art, dance and theatre groups. (While welcomed by many, the centre is not without controversy, with several community groups questioning Eurobodalla Shire Council's design and community consultation process.)

South Tribe and Cultivate Space
A recent push by digital creatives and artists into Batemans Bay's industrial estate also signals this new chapter. Based at the South Tribe and Cultivate Space business and arts incubators, these grass roots non-government centres spawned a thriving and growing community of artists, creatives, freelancers, entrepreneurs and digital nomads.

On 26 July 2020, the owners of South Tribe and Cultivate Space announced the closure of the centre on their Facebook page, citing difficulties with the COVID-19 pandemic in Australia.

Sculpture on Clyde
A ten-day art festival celebrating imagination in 3D, debuted in 2017 as a bold and generous new acquisitive art prize. Set along the foreshore of the pristine Clyde River, it is one of Australia's richest 3D art prizes. Presented by The Batemans Bay Tourism and Business Chamber, the festival is open to professional, emerging and novice artists worldwide with 2018 prize money to the value of $70,000. The inaugural acquisitive prize was won by Dora A. Rognvaldsdottir for Duet.

South East Arts (SEArts) is the regional development organisation for arts and culture in the Bega Valley, Eurobodalla and Snowy Monaro.

Food and produce 

Batemans Bay sits as the northern gateway to the pristine Eurobodalla Shire - the entire region gaining national recognition for its terroir and as a centre for sustainable agriculture. Most notably for the town itself, are the oysters from the Clyde River. One of Australia's cleanest estuaries, the Clyde produces what is considered by a growing number to be Australia's best oyster. These are available widely on local menus and at farm gates.

Buildings and architecture 
Batemans Bay has many historical buildings, sharing an insight into the areas colourful past. Northcourt Arcade was erected in 1935 as a hospital and operated until the 1960s. During these years the community fought for a more updated structure and all patients were moved to the new location on Pacific Street in 1970.

Transport

Highways 
Batemans Bay is located at the junction of the Princes Highway which runs down the south coast of New South Wales and the Kings Highway, which runs from Canberra to the coast.

Batemans Bay Bridge 
Batemans Bay is the only place where coastal traffic can cross the Clyde River. From 1915 to 1954 a motorised punt allowed traffic to cross the river. The former Batemans Bay Bridge was officially opened in 1956 and became a much loved landmark of the town. It was a steel vertical lift truss bridge with a maximum height of 34 metres. In 2019 work began on a replacement concrete bridge with a clearance of 12 metres. Due to this replacement project, the former steel truss bridge has been disassembled and removed, with parts of the former bridge to be turned into a sculpture on the foreshore. The new concrete bridge formally opened on 27 March 2021, with a public event for the local population that morning. The former bridge is now commemorated in public art throughout the town, including a mural on the new one, a mural on the Boatshed restaurant, and a sculpture made from its material, titled Tides.

Moruya Airport 
Moruya Airport is located approximately 30 km south of the town; flights service the route between Sydney and Moruya.

Climate
Batemans Bay experiences an oceanic climate (Köppen climate classification Cfb). The climate of Batemans Bay is moderated by the sea, with warm summers and mild sunny winters. Nights can be cold in winter, due to its somewhat inland position. Thunderstorms mostly occur between November and March, with rainfall maximums in summer. The town gets 87.3 clear days annually. The town's drier winter trend is owed to its position on the leeward side of the Great Dividing Range, which block the moist, westerly cold fronts that arrive from the Southern Ocean and, therefore, would turn into foehn winds as they approach the coastal plain.

Media 

Radio stations
East Coast Radio 2EC (FM 105.9 – commercial)
 Power FM NSW South Coast (FM 104.3 – commercial) – POWER FM from Nowra can also be received in parts of Batemans Bay on FM 94.9.
2 EAR FM (Eurobodalla Access Radio FM 107.5 – community station)
 Hot Country Radio (87.6FM – commercial – country music format)
 Sky Sports Radio (FM 96.3)
 ABC South East NSW (FM 103.5) – part of the ABC Local Radio network
 Radio National (FM 105.1)
 ABC NewsRadio (FM 100.5)
 ABC Classic FM (FM 101.9) – also on 95.7 from the adjacent Illawarra region.
 Triple J (FM 98.9 – from the adjacent Illawarra region). A local service from Mount Wandera is planned, subject to the clearance of local television stations.

Television
Batemans Bay and the Eurobodalla region receive five free-to-air television stations (television in Australia) including two government funded networks:

The ABC, the SBS and three commercial networks:

 Prime7
 Nine and
 Southern Cross 10

ABC, SBS, PRIME7, Nine (WIN) and Southern Cross 10 all offer digital high-definition simulcasts of their main channels.

All five networks broadcast  additional channels including: 7two, 7mate, 7flix, 9Go!, 9Gem, 9Life, ABC TV Plus, ABC ME, ABC News, SBS Viceland, SBS World Movies, SBS Food, 10 Bold, 10 Peach and 10 Shake.

Newspapers
The local newspaper for Batemans Bay and the Eurobodalla region is The Bay Post; published by Fairfax Media.

The Beagle Weekly is an independent online newspaper covering the Eurobodalla shire from South Durras to Tilba Tilba. Established in November 2016 it provides a full news service.

Daily newspapers such as The Canberra Times, the Illawarra Mercury from Wollongong, the Sydney Morning Herald, the Daily Telegraph, The Australian, The Age, Herald Sun and the Australian Financial Review are available in Batemans Bay. Some local newspapers from other NSW South Coast towns such as Bega, Nowra, Ulladulla, Moruya, Merimbula and Narooma are also available.

See also 
 List of ports in Australia

References

Further reading

 
 

Towns in New South Wales
Towns in the South Coast (New South Wales)
Marinas in Australia
Eurobodalla Shire
Coastal towns in New South Wales